Justice M.A. Rasheed was a Civil Servant of Pakistan (CSP) who was later on inducted into the judiciary and served as the chief justice of the high court of Balochistan from October 1977 to July 1978. He had been a District or Sessions Judge in the District Courts of Bahawalpur from 1966 to 1968. He is the only Judge of Pakistan to have taken his oath of office in the United States. He refused to take oath under Gen Zia's PCO of 1981. Later on he served as Vice Chancellor of University of Balochistan.

See also
Minhas
Muslim Rajput

References

University of Balochistan
Chief Justices of the Balochistan High Court
People from Quetta
Living people
Year of birth missing (living people)